Aqua Crabra was a Roman aqueduct supplying villas in the hinterland of the ancient town of Tusculum.

The Aqua Crabra is described by Cicero in his treatise De Lege Agraria ("On the Agrarian Law") where we learn it supplied his villa near Tusculum.

The aqueduct is also attested in the text of Frontinus.
The Crabra is sometimes referred to as Aqua Mariana or Aqua Maranna del Maria.

Archaeological discoveries announced in December 2014 in conjunction with Rome's Metro C excavations have been preliminarily linked with the Aqua Crabra. This discovery consists of a large hydraulic reservoir, perhaps the largest known from the ancient city, along with a water wheel and agricultural implements.

See also 
List of aqueducts in the Roman Empire
List of Roman aqueducts by date
Ancient Roman technology
Roman engineering

References

External links 
 "Metro C, a San Giovanni trovato il più grande bacino idrico della Roma Imperiale" La Repubblica 3 December 2014

Roman sites in Lazio
Roman aqueducts in Italy